Arlene Stringer-Cuevas (née Gluss; September 25, 1933 – April 3, 2020) was an American politician, educator, and civil servant. She was a schoolteacher before serving on the New York City Council from 1976 to 1977. Stringer-Cuevas later worked for the New York City Human Resources Administration for 16 years until her retirement in 1994. She died during the COVID-19 pandemic due to complications of COVID-19.

Early life
Stringer-Cuevas was born Arlene Gluss in the Bronx, and was a school teacher. She lived in the Washington Heights, Manhattan. She was Jewish.

Career 
Stringer-Cuevas served as her neighborhood's Democratic Party district leader from 1969 to 1976. She was elected to the New York City Council in 1976 after winning a four-person primary for the Democratic nomination, becoming the first woman to represent Washington Heights. Stringer-Cuevas was defeated in the Democratic primary in 1977.

Stringer-Cuevas then worked for the New York City Human Resources Administration from 1978 until her retirement in 1994.

Personal life 
Stringer-Cuevas was part of a politically active family. Her first husband, Ronald Stringer, was an assistant to New York City Mayor Abraham Beame. Her second husband, Carlos Cuevas, was the New York City Clerk and a Deputy Borough President of the Bronx. Stringer-Cuevas' son Scott Stringer was elected Borough President of Manhattan and New York City Comptroller. She was the cousin of politician women's rights pioneer Bella Abzug.

On April 3, 2020, at the age of 86, Stringer-Cuevas died from complications due to COVID-19 at Montefiore Medical Center in the Bronx.

References

External links 

2015 interview by the New York Public Library Community Oral History Project - 

1933 births
2020 deaths
20th-century American educators
20th-century United States government officials
20th-century American women educators
American women civil servants
Deaths from the COVID-19 pandemic in New York (state)
Educators from New York City
Jewish American people in New York (state) politics
Jewish women politicians
New York (state) Democrats
New York City Council members
People from Washington Heights, Manhattan
Politicians from the Bronx
Politicians from Manhattan
Schoolteachers from New York (state)
Women New York City Council members